Branko Martinović (29 November 1937 – 26 February 2015) was a Serbian wrestler who competed in the 1960 Summer Olympics and in the 1964 Summer Olympics. He was born in Belgrade.

References

External links
 

1932 births
2015 deaths
Sportspeople from Belgrade
Serbian male sport wrestlers
Olympic wrestlers of Yugoslavia
Wrestlers at the 1960 Summer Olympics
Wrestlers at the 1964 Summer Olympics
Yugoslav male sport wrestlers
Olympic silver medalists for Yugoslavia
Olympic bronze medalists for Yugoslavia
Olympic medalists in wrestling
World Wrestling Championships medalists
Medalists at the 1964 Summer Olympics
Medalists at the 1960 Summer Olympics
Mediterranean Games gold medalists for Yugoslavia
Competitors at the 1963 Mediterranean Games
Mediterranean Games medalists in wrestling
European Wrestling Championships medalists